Chris Noonan (born 1952) is an Australian filmmaker.

Chris Noonan may also refer to:

Chris Noonan (ice hockey) (born 1988), American ice hockey goaltender 
Chris Noonan (academic), a New Zealand law academic